Nisha P. Rajagopalan (born 22 October 1980), is a Carnatic musician. Her mother, Vasundhara Rajagopal, is an established disciple of Gopala Iyer, a descendant of Koteeswara Iyer, the prominent composer. Nisha commenced her training in vocal music from her mother, and later received training from T. R. Subramaniam, Calcutta Krishnamoorthy, Suguna Varadachary, and P. S. Narayanswamy.

She is an A grade artiste of All India Radio, Chennai and an accredited artiste with the Indian Council for Cultural Relations (ICCR).

Family
Nisha was resident in Toronto, Canada with her parents as her father Rajagopalan was employed there. She is the middle one of three daughters. She moved with her mother and sisters to New Delhi to learn music from Professor T. R. Subramaniam. In 1995 her father found a job in Chennai and they all moved to Chennai. Nisha's husband Arvind is a pilot. They have a son, Vidyut, born in 2014.

Awards and felicitations
She has received the following awards:
The Hindu Saregama M S Subbulakshmi Award (first ever recipient of the award) (2011)
Isai Peroli (Kartik Fine Arts)
Kalki Krishnamurthy Memorial Award (Kalki Krishnamurthy Memorial Trust)
Shanmukha Sangeetha Shiromani Award (Sri Shanmukhananda Fine Arts and Sangeetha Sabha)
Outstanding Lady Vocalist (The Music Academy)

References

External links
 
 Vasundhara Rajagopal

1980 births
Women Carnatic singers
Carnatic singers
Singers from Tamil Nadu
Living people
Women musicians from Tamil Nadu
21st-century Indian women classical singers